Packs Branch is an unincorporated community in Fayette County, West Virginia, United States. It was also called O'Neals.

The community was named after nearby Packs Branch.

References 

Unincorporated communities in West Virginia
Unincorporated communities in Fayette County, West Virginia